Riku is both a masculine Finnish given name and a unisex Japanese given name. Notable people with the name include:

, Japanese footballer
Riku Hahl (born 1980), Finnish NHL hockey player
, Japanese footballer
Riku Heini (born 1990), Finnish footballer for FC Lahti
Riku Helenius (born 1988), Finnish NHL hockey player
Riku Kiri (born 1963), Finnish sportsman
Riku Lätti (born 1973), South African singer, songwriter and writer
Riku Matsuda (disambiguation), multiple people
, Japanese novelist
, Japanese figure skater
, Japanese voice actress
, Japanese footballer
Riku Rantala (born 1974), Finnish journalist and presenter
Riku Riski (born 1989), Finnish midfielder footballer, who represents Turun Palloseura of Veikkausliiga
, Japanese manga artist
, Japanese footballer
, Japanese footballer

Fictional characters
Riku Nanase, character in IDOLiSH7
Riku Asakura, character in Ultraman Geed
Riku Kitazawa, character in the Gravitation universe
Riku Harada, character in D.N.Angel media
Riku Miyagusuku, character in the Blood+ universe
Riku (Kino's Journey), character in Kino's Journey media
Riku (Kingdom Hearts), character in Kingdom Hearts media
Rikku, a character in the Final Fantasy series.
Riku Dola, character in No Game No Life: Zero
Riku, character in movie 47 Ronin (2013)
Riku, supporting character in Princess Half-Demon, the spinoff to Inuyasha and Inuyasha: The Final Act
Riku Tanaka, episodic character in Years and Years

See also
Rinku (disambiguation)
Rick (disambiguation)

References 

Finnish masculine given names
Japanese unisex given names